Belalp is a village and ski resort in the Swiss canton of Valais, situated at approximately  above sea level in the municipality of Naters. Because of its altitude, Belalp is a vantage point offering views of the Dom and Fletschhorn mountains and other peaks of the Pennine and Lepontine Alps. Close to the village are the summits of Nesthorn, Hohstock and Sparrhorn mountains.

Belalp is a car free village. It can be reached from Blatten bei Naters by cable car.

Notable residents

The British and Irish physicist John Tyndall maintained a holiday home in the village from 1877.

References

External links
Official website

Villages in Valais
Ski areas and resorts in Switzerland
Car-free villages in Switzerland